Marc Veyrat (born 8 May 1950) is a French chef from the Haute-Savoie region, who specialises in molecular gastronomy and the use of mountain plants and herbs.

Veyrat has obtained a total of nine Michelin Stars and is the first cook to get the perfect grade of 20/20 in the Gault et Millau guide for each of his two first restaurants.

He was the owner of the restaurants La Maison de Marc Veyrat (or l'Auberge de l'Eridan) in Veyrier-du-Lac and la Ferme de mon Père in Megève. He currently operates the restaurant La Maison des Bois in Manigod. All three restaurants obtained three stars. In 2019, Veyrat was awarded two Michelin Stars for La Maison des Bois, and is suing Michelin saying that the loss of one star was a miscommunication.

On 24 February 2009, he announced that he would cease all of his activities at la Maison de Marc Veyrat due to his declining health. The hotel is currently being run by his children.

He started a chain of organic "fast-food" restaurants all over France called la Cozna Vera. The first one opened in Annecy in 2008 and was later closed in 2010. He has plans to build other restaurants in Épagny, Brussels, and Paris.

His work was featured on the Discovery Channel's Discovery Atlas: France Revealed.

In December 2015, Veyrat was fined €100,000 by a French court after illegally cutting down 7,000 sq metres of protected forest near one of his restaurants.

Cuisine
Marc Veyrat is known for his creativity and use of natural and organic ingredients. He specialises in molecular gastronomy.  Rather than using butter, flour, eggs, oil, or cream, he instead uses roots, mountain plants, mountain herbs, and wild flowers harvested in the French Alps.

Controversy
After losing his third Michelin star in the 2019 edition of the Red Guide which appeared in January 2019, Marc Veyrat asked in July to be removed from the guide, but Michelin refused. In September 2019 he filed a suit against Michelin demanding a full explanation for the lost star, including the notes made by inspectors at the time of their visit and the explicit reasons for the removal of the third star. However, the judges held that "the independence of the evaluation constitutes the liberty of expression of the guide's inspectors," and ordered him to pay the court costs.

Gallery

Bibliography
 Fou de saveurs (1994)
 Herbier gourmand (1997)
 La cuisine paysanne (1998)
 Quatre saisons (à la carte) (2000)
 L'herbier des montagnes – Tout savoir sur les plantes et les fleurs d'altitude (2000)
 Déguster les plantes sauvages (2003)
 L'encyclopédie culinaire du XXIe siècle (2003)
 L'herbier à croquer (2004)
 Le gibier en 80 recettes (2004)
 Herbier gourmand (2004)
 Cuisine paysanne (2005)

References

External links
 marcveyrat.fr
 Gourmandia Profile

1950 births
Living people
French chefs
Cuisine of Auvergne-Rhône-Alpes
Head chefs of Michelin starred restaurants